Michel Droit (23 January 1923 in Vincennes, Val-de-Marne – 22 June 2000) was a French novelist and journalist. He was the father of the photographer Éric Droit (1954–2007).

Biography
After studying at the Faculté des lettres de Paris and Sciences Po, Droit joined the army in 1944 and was wounded near Ulm in April 1945. He took on a career as a press, radio and television journalist after the Second World War and at the 1960s he was the preferred television interviewer of général de Gaulle.

His first novel, Plus rien au monde, dates to 1954. In 1964, he won the Grand prix du roman de l'Académie française for his Le Retour. On 6 March 1980, on the same day as Marguerite Yourcenar, he was elected as a member of the Académie française, replacing Joseph Kessel.

Droit wrote a polemic against a reggae adaptation of La Marseillaise as Aux armes et cætera by Serge Gainsbourg, reproaching him for "provoking" a resurgence of anti-Semitism and thus making things difficult for his "co-religionists". Droit was attacked for this position by the Mouvement contre le racisme et pour l'amitié entre les peuples.

Droit got into legal difficulties as a member of the CNCL, a television regulator set up in the 1980s, but this was thrown out of court with the help of his lawyer Jean-Marc Varaut.

Droit accidentally killed one of his companions on a safari in Africa.

Droit is buried in the Passy Cemetery.

Works 
De Lattre Maréchal de France, Pierre Horay, 1952 (livre sur Jean de Lattre de Tassigny)
André Maurois, Éditions universitaires, 1953 (livre sur André Maurois)
Plus rien au monde, Prix Max Barthou, Ferencz, 1954
Jours et Nuits d’Amérique, Georges Nizet, 1954
Visas pour l’Amérique du Sud, Gallimar, 1956
Pueblo, Julliard, 1957
J’ai vu vivre le Japon, Fayard, 1958
Panoramas mexicains, Fayard, 1960
La Camargue, Prix Carlos de Lazerme, Benjamin Arthaud, 1961
Le Retour, Grand Prix du roman de l'Académie française, Julliard, 1964
 Les Compagnons de la Forêt-Noire, Julliard, 1966, Tome 1 de la série "le temps des hommes"
La Fille de l’ancre bleue, Solar,1967
L’Orient perdu, Julliard, 1969, Tome 2 de la série "le temps des hommes"
L’Homme du destin, Larrieu-Bonnel,1972
La Ville blanche, Julliard, 1973, Tome 3 de la série "le temps des hommes"
La coupe est pleine, France-Empire, 1975
La Mort du connétable, Julliard, 1976, Tome 4 de la série "le temps des hommes"
Les Feux du crépuscule, Plon, 1977
Les Clartés du jour, Plon, 1978
Le Lion et le Marabout, Plon, 1979
Les Lueurs de l’aube, Plon, 1981
Une plume et un micro, Plon, 1982
Et maintenant si nous parlions de l’Afrique du Sud, Plon, 1983
Une fois la nuit venue, Plon, 1984
Lettre ouverte à ceux qui en ont plus qu’assez du socialisme, Albin Michel, 1985
La Rivière de la guerre, Julliard, 1985
Le Fils unique, Plon, 1988
Le Rendez-vous d’Elchingen, Plon, 1990
Nous parlerons de Rome, Le Fallois, 1992
Le Temps d’apprendre à vivre, Le Rocher, 1993
Le Temps qui tient au cœur, Le Rocher, 1996

References

External links

  Dossier
  Homage to Michel Droit
  Homage to Michel Droit

1923 births
2000 deaths
Lycée Louis-le-Grand alumni
People from Vincennes
Members of the Académie Française
Burials at Passy Cemetery
Grand Prix du roman de l'Académie française winners
20th-century French novelists
French male novelists
20th-century French male writers
French male non-fiction writers
20th-century French journalists